Flagstaff Mountain is a foothill on the eastern flank of the Front Range of the Rocky Mountains of North America, located in the Flatirons region. The  peak is located in Boulder Mountain Park in Boulder County, Colorado, United States.

Mountain
From the peak of Flagstaff Mountain one can see Boulder, Metropolitan Denver, and the surrounding mountains. There are hiking and bike trails, picnic areas, the Summit Nature Center, and an outdoor amphitheatre, as well as the Flagstaff House Restaurant on the mountain.

Hobo Cave 
Hobo Cave is a small single-room cave found beneath a rock buttress on Flagstaff Mountain. Climbers sometimes use it for bouldering.

See also

List of Colorado mountain ranges
List of Colorado mountain summits
List of Colorado fourteeners
List of Colorado 4000 meter prominent summits
List of the most prominent summits of Colorado
List of Colorado county high points

References

External links

Flagstaff Summit Trailhead at the City of Boulder website.

Mountains of Colorado
Mountains of Boulder County, Colorado
North American 2000 m summits
Protected areas of Boulder County, Colorado